The 1923 Baltimore mayoral election saw the election of Howard W. Jackson.

General election
The general election was held May 8, 1923.

References

Baltimore mayoral
Mayoral elections in Baltimore
Baltimore